Joe Gallagher is an Irish sportsperson.  He plays hurling with his local club Kildangan and with the Tipperary senior inter-county team since 2016.

Career
Gallagher was named in the Tipperary squad for the 2016 National Hurling League and made his league debut on 13 February against Dublin when he came on as a substitute.

Honours

Tipperary
 All-Ireland Intermediate Hurling Championship (1): 2012
 Munster Under-21 Hurling Championship (1): 2010
 All-Ireland Under-21 Hurling Championship (1): 2010
 All-Ireland Minor Hurling Championship (1): 2007
 Munster Minor Hurling Championship (1): 2007

References

External links
Tipperary GAA Player Profile

Tipperary inter-county hurlers
Kildangan hurlers (Tipperary)
Living people
Year of birth missing (living people)